Acraga philetera is a moth in the family Dalceridae. It was described by Schaus in 1910. It is found in Costa Rica.

The wingspan is about 22 mm. The body is orange and the forewings are orange, darkest on the inner margin. The hindwings are orange with the costal margin broadly whitish yellow. The underside is paler.

Taxonomy
Acraga conda is part of the Acraga infusa species complex.

References

Moths described in 1910
Dalceridae